This table shows the list of all historical monuments classified or listed in the city of Ajaccio, Corse-du-Sud, Corsica.

See also
 List of historical monuments of Bastia
 Monument historique

References

 
Corse-du-Sud-related lists